Katgharwa is a village in West Champaran district in the Indian state of Bihar.

Demographics
As of 2011 India census, Katgharwa had a population of 1817 in 316 households. Males constitute 51.89% of the population and females 48.1%. Katgharwa has an average literacy rate of 40.39%, lower than the national average of 74%: male literacy is 63.35%, and female literacy is 36.64%. In Katgharwa, 24.65% of the population is under 6 years of age.

References

Villages in West Champaran district